Triacanthus is a genus in tripod fish family (Triacanthidae) native to the Indian Ocean and the western Pacific Ocean.

Species
There are currently 2 recognized species in this genus:
 Triacanthus biaculeatus Bloch, 1786 (Short-nosed tripodfish)
 Triacanthus nieuhofii Bleeker, 1852 (Silver tripodfish)

References

Tetraodontiformes
Marine fish genera
Taxa named by Lorenz Oken